Evolutionarily conserved signaling intermediate in Toll pathway, mitochondrial (ECSIT), also known as SITPEC, is a protein that in humans is encoded by the ECSIT gene. ECSIT is a cytosolic adaptor protein involved in inflammatory responses, embryonic development, and the assembly and stabilization of mitochondrial NADH:ubiquinone oxidoreductase (complex I).

Structure 
ECSIT is located on the p arm of chromosome 19 in position 13.2 and has 9 exons. The ECSIT gene produces a 49 kDa protein composed of 431 amino acids. ECSIT's interactions with p65/p50 NF-κB proteins is dependent on lysine 372 ubiquitination. ECSIT also contains an N-terminal targeting signal that causes it to localize to mitochondria where only the 45 kDa mitochondrial ECSIT is found to interact.

Function 
ECSIT has been found to play multiple roles in cell-signaling, including those that utilize Toll-like receptors (TLRs), TGF-β, and BMP. ECSIT plays a regulatory role as part of the TAK1-ECSIT-TRAF6 complex that is involved in the activation of NF-κB by the TLR4 signal and through its interactions with TRIM59 to negatively regulate NF-κB, IRF-3, and IRF-7-mediated signal pathways. Additionally, ECSIT appears to contribute to bactericidal activity in TLR signaling through its interaction with tumor necrosis factor receptor-associated factor 6 (TRAF6). Importantly, ubiquitination of ECSIT has shown itself to be necessary for the activation of p65/p50 NF-κBs in TLR4 signaling. Functioning as a scaffold protein, ECSIT is also essential for the association of RIG-I-like receptors (RIG-I or MDA5) to VISA. The bridging of these receptors to VISA is an important signaling event used in innate antiviral responses. Apart from inflammatory and immune responses, ECSIT, in its 45 kDa, mitochondrial form helps maintain assembly chaperone NDUFAF1's stable presence in the mitochondrion. Through this interaction, ECSIT is demonstrated to play an important role in NADH:ubiquinone oxidoreductase (complex I) assembly and stabilization. Finally, it is important to note that ECSIT is required for normal embryonic development.

Interactions 
ECSIT has 136 protein-protein interactions, with 53 of them being co-complex interactions.
 In addition to TAK1, TRAF6, TRIM59, RIG-I-like receptors, VISA, and NDUFAF1 interactions, ECSIT can interact with MAP3K1 and SMAD4, and is a part of the mitochondrial complex I assembly (MCIA) complex.

References

Further reading 

 

Human proteins